José Luis González  (born 27 December 1984) is an Argentine volleyball player. He was part of the Argentina men's national volleyball team at the 2014 FIVB Volleyball Men's World Championship in Poland. On club level he plays for Paris Volley.

Sporting achievements

National team
 2005  South American Volleyball Championship
 2015  Pan American Games

Club level
 2006  Liga Argentina de Voleibol

References

1984 births
Living people
Argentine men's volleyball players
Place of birth missing (living people)
Volleyball players at the 2015 Pan American Games
Pan American Games gold medalists for Argentina
Olympic volleyball players of Argentina
Volleyball players at the 2016 Summer Olympics
Panathinaikos V.C. players
Pan American Games medalists in volleyball
Medalists at the 2015 Pan American Games
21st-century Argentine people